Green Ridge Township is an inactive township in Pettis County, in the U.S. state of Missouri.

Green Ridge Township was erected in 1873, and named for a verdant ridge within its borders.

References

Townships in Missouri
Townships in Pettis County, Missouri